The Management and Labour Studies is a quarterly refereed journal that provides a platform for research and discussion in the areas of management, labour and related subjects.

The Journal is published by SAGE Publications, India in Association with the XLRI School of Business and Human Resources, Jamshedpur.

The journal is a member of the Committee on Publication Ethics (COPE).

Abstracting and indexing 
Management and Labour Studies is abstracted and indexed in:
 Research Papers in Economics (RePEc)
 DeepDyve
 J-Gate

External links 
 
 Homepage

References 

 COPE

SAGE Publishing academic journals
Publications established in 2012
Labour journals
Business and management journals
English-language journals